Alfons Freiherr von Czibulka, or Alfons Cibulka (born 28 June 1888, Ratboř Castle (Schloss Radborsch) near Kolín, Bohemia – died 22 October 1969, Munich) was a Czech-Austrian writer and painter. (Pseudonym A. von Birnitz)

Czibulka was the son of general Freiherr Hubert von Czibulka and Marie von Birnitz. In 1919 he co-founded the magazine 
Der Orchideengarten with Karl Hans Strobl, a fantasy magazine which also published some science fiction
and  detective stories.

In the Third Reich he received the "Literary Prize of the City Munich" in 1938.

Literary works
Die grossen Kapitäne (biography, 1923)
Prinz Eugen (biography, 1927)
Der Münzturm (novel, 1936)
Der Kerzlmacher von St. Stephan (novel, 1937)
Das Abschiedskonzert (novel, 1944)
Reich mir die Hand, mein Leben (novel, 1956)

References

1888 births
1969 deaths
Czech male writers
Austrian male writers
Czech painters
Czech male painters
20th-century Austrian painters
Austrian male painters
Bohemian nobility
Barons of Austria
Austrian people of Czech descent
People from Kolín District
20th-century Austrian male artists